Calymmanthium is a monotypic genus of primitive tree-like cacti from northern Peru. The only species is Calymmanthium substerile (also known as C. fertile). It belongs to the tribe Lymanbensonieae. Calymmanthium is absolutely unique among flowering plants in the mode of its floral development. The young flower is completely encased within the plant's stem until it is fully developed, at which time a crack develops in the stem, allowing pollinators access.

Diploperianthium F.Ritter (nom. inval.) has been brought into synonymy with this genus.

References

Cactoideae
Cactoideae genera
Cacti of South America
Endemic flora of Peru
Monotypic Cactaceae genera